Taekwondo competitions at the 2011 Pan American Games in Guadalajara were held from October 15 to October 18 at the CODE II Gymnasium.

Medal summary

Medal table

Men's events

Women's events

Schedule
All times are Central Daylight time (UTC-5).

Qualification

Qualification was done at the 2011 Pan American Games Qualification Tournament in Lima, Peru between March 25 and 26, 2011. The tournament was a knockout tournament, in which the final placements were not determined. There is also a further eight spots available as wildcards.

Summary

References

 
Events at the 2011 Pan American Games
Pan American Games
2011